The women's points race at the 2008 Dutch National Track Championships in Apeldoorn took place at Omnisport Apeldoorn from 27 December to 30 December 2008. 24 athletes participated in the contest.

Competition format
The tournament started with a qualifying round, including two heats. The best 8 riders of each heat advanced to the final race.

Schedule
Saturday 27 December
21:35 Qualifying
Tuesday 30 December
15:00 Final race

Final results

Final results

References

2008 Dutch National track cycling championships
Dutch National Track Championships – Women's points race